Antoine Deparcieux (28 October 17032 September 1768) was a French mathematician.
He was born at Clessous in the Portes, department of Gard. He attended the school of Saint Florent for 10 years while working on his family farm. In 1725, his desire for learning took him to Lyon, where he studied at a Jesuit school for five years. Then, in 1730, he went to Paris to increase his knowledge of mathematics and physics. He made a living by manufacturing sundials.

In 1746, he became a member of the Academy of Sciences, and in about 1765 was named Censeur Royal. He was also librarian at the University of Strasbourg, and member of the Academy of Sciences of Paris, Montpellier, Lyon, Amiens, Metz, Berlin, and Stockholm.

Accomplishments

Among his constructions were:
 A machine to raise water at Crécy castle
 A pump for castle of Arnouville
 A press for the production of tobacco

He also published many works, including:
 Traité de trigonométrie rectiligne et sphérique (1738), approved by the Academy of Sciences
 Nouveau traité de trigonométrie, (avec table des sinus et logarithmes) (1740)
 Traité complet de Gnomonique (1741)
 Essai sur les probabilités de la durée de la vie humaine (1746) ("Essay on the probabilities of the human lifespan"), which is the work for which he is best known
 Mémoire sur la courbure des ondes (1747)

In 1758, Deparcieux was elected a foreign member of the Royal Swedish Academy of Sciences.

See also
Life annuity

References

External links
 

18th-century French mathematicians
Members of the French Academy of Sciences
Members of the Royal Swedish Academy of Sciences
1703 births
1768 deaths